This is a list of yearly Great Lakes Valley Conference football standings.

Great Lakes Valley standings

References

Standings
Great Lakes Valley Conference